Rafael Andrés Guarga Ferro (born 23 August 1940 in Montevideo) is a Uruguayan industrial engineer and inventor.

Career
After graduating from the University of the Republic, Guarga had to leave his country due to the civic-military dictatorship. He pursued his career in Mexico, obtaining a doctorate at the National Autonomous University of Mexico. Back in Uruguay he devoted himself to lecturing; in 1992-1998 he served as Dean of the School of Engineering, and in 1998-2006 as Rector of the university.

In the late 1990s Guarga invented the selective inverted sink (acronym SIS), a device used by farmers to protect plants from frost.

References

1940 births
Living people
University of the Republic (Uruguay) alumni
Academic staff of the University of the Republic (Uruguay)
University of the Republic (Uruguay) rectors
Uruguayan engineers
National Autonomous University of Mexico alumni
Academic staff of the National Autonomous University of Mexico
Uruguayan inventors